Barbara Niewiedział ( Bieganowska born 1 September 1981) is a Paralympian athlete from Poland competing mainly in category T20 sprint and middle-distance events. She is a two time Paralympic gold medalist in the 800m (2000) and 1,500 metres (2012) races and has won four World Athletic titles.

Personal history
Niewiedział was born Barbara Bieganowska in Nysa, Poland in 1981. She has two daughters.

Athletics career
Niewiedział first came to note as an athlete when in 1999 she set a world record mark of 57.48 in the 400 metres at a meet in Seville. She followed this with a gold medal in the 800 metres at the 2000 Summer Paralympics in Sydney, beating her team-mate and long-time rival Arleta Meloch into second place. After Sydney Niewidzial's career as an athlete was halted due to her classification being suspended by the International Paralympic Committee (IPC) following the cheating scandal at the 2000 Games.

In 2009, the IPC decided to reinstate athletes with intellectual disabilities in readiness for the 2012 Summer Paralympics in London. Niewiedział's return to major international athletics came when she was selected for the Poland team at the 2011 IPC Athletics World Championships in Christchurch. There she competed in the 1,500 metres race, coming second to Meloch. Niewidzial followed this with a gold medal in the 1,500 metres at the 2012 IPC Athletics European Championships in Stadskanaal before winning her second Paralympic gold in the same event in London.

Niewiedział had planned to retire after the London Paralympics, but the experience of competing in front of a cheering capacity crowd that the 2012 Games provided changed her decision.  Further success followed at the 2013 IPC Athletics World Championships in Lyon where she took gold in her favoured 1,500m. She furthered this success two years later at the World Championships in Doha, taking three gold medals in the 400m, 800m and the 1,500m races.

In the build up to the 2016 Summer Paralympics, Niewiedział travelled to Italy to take part in the 2016 IPC Athletics European Championships in Grosseto. She won both of her races to take the 400m and 1,500m titles.

Notes

External links
 

Paralympic athletes of Poland
Athletes (track and field) at the 2012 Summer Paralympics
Athletes (track and field) at the 2016 Summer Paralympics
Athletes (track and field) at the 2020 Summer Paralympics
Paralympic gold medalists for Poland
Living people
Polish female middle-distance runners
Polish female sprinters
World record holders in Paralympic athletics
1981 births
People from Nysa, Poland
Medalists at the 2000 Summer Paralympics
Medalists at the 2012 Summer Paralympics
Medalists at the 2016 Summer Paralympics
Medalists at the 2020 Summer Paralympics
Competitors in athletics with intellectual disability
Paralympic medalists in athletics (track and field)